SS Frinton was the name of a number of Steamships, including:

, a Great Eastern Railway ferry
, a Frinton Shipping Line cargo ship

Ship names